Adela cuneella is a species of moth of the family Adelidae. It is known from South Africa.

References

Endemic moths of South Africa
Adelidae
Moths of Africa
Taxa named by Thomas de Grey, 6th Baron Walsingham
Moths described in 1891